Ceratotrochus is a genus of cnidarians belonging to the family Caryophylliidae.

The genus has almost cosmopolitan distribution.

Species

Species:

Ceratotrochus ambiguus 
Ceratotrochus amphitrites 
Ceratotrochus australiensis

References

Caryophylliidae
Scleractinia genera